The Kanmailia are a Muslim community found in the state of Uttar Pradesh in India. Their preferred self-designation is Shaikh.

Origin 

The Kanmailia are a Muslim occupational caste, that traditionally specialized in cleaning ear wax. They get their name from two Hindi words, kan meaning ears and mailia meaning dirt. During the period of British colonial rule, the Kanmailia were declared to be a criminal tribe under the Criminal Tribes Act. After independence, they were denotified in 1952, when the Criminal Tribes Act was replaced with the Habitual Offenders Act, but the community continues to carry considerable social stigma. Little is known about the origin of this community. Their own traditions speak of the community descending from early Arab settlers to India, and the community prefer the self designation Shaikh, a name traditionally associated with those groups who claim an Arab ancestry in India. They are found mainly in Lucknow, and the districts of Ghazipur and Etawah.

Present circumstances 

The Kanmailia are strictly endogamous, and marry close kin. Each Kanmailia settlement contains an informal caste council, known as a biradari panchayat, which acts as an instrument of social control. The Kanmailia are Sunni Muslims, but still incorporate many folk beliefs and traditions. Most Kanmailia are still engaged in cleaning ear wax. They are often found at bus stations and train stations practising their occupation. A small number are now employed as day labourers. They are an extremely marginalized community, suffering from severe poverty.

See also 

Kanjar

References 

Social groups of Uttar Pradesh
Muslim communities of Uttar Pradesh
Muslim communities of India